Richard Pryor: Omit the Logic is a 2013 American biographical documentary film directed by Marina Zenovich, who also writing with P.G. Morgan and Chris A. Peterson. The film is about the life of comedian and actor Richard Pryor.

The film premiered at the Tribeca Film Festival on April 26, 2013. It also aired in the United Kingdom on BBC Four as part of their Storyville strand of documentaries and in the United States on Showtime on July 31, 2013. The documentary won the NAACP Image Award for Best Television Documentary and editor, Chris A. Peterson, was nominated for a Primetime Emmy Award for Outstanding Editing.

References

External links

2013 films
2010s biographical films
2013 documentary films
American biographical films
American documentary films
American documentary television films
BBC television documentaries
Documentary films about comedy and comedians
Showtime (TV network) films
Richard Pryor
2010s English-language films
2010s American films
2010s British films